Colegio Los Leones de Quilpué is a Chilean professional basketball club from Quilpué, the capital of the Marga Marga Province in central Chile. The team competes in the international Liga Sudamericana de Básquetbol and the national Liga Nacional de Básquetbol de Chile.

Trophies
 Copa Chile: 1
2016

Notable players
- Set a club record or won an individual award as a professional player.
- Played at least one official international match for his senior national team at any time.
  Ignacio Carrion
  Eduardo Marechal
  John Taylor

References

External links
Presentation at Latinbasket.com
Presentation at league website

 Basketball teams established in 2009
 Basketball teams in Chile
 Marga Marga